In mathematics, a Poisson–Lie group is a Poisson manifold that is also a Lie group, with the group multiplication being compatible with the Poisson algebra structure on the manifold.

The infinitesimal counterpart of a Poisson–Lie group is a Lie bialgebra, in analogy to Lie algebras as the infinitesimal counterparts of Lie groups.

Many quantum groups are quantizations of the Poisson algebra of functions on a Poisson–Lie group.

Definition

Explicitly, the following identity must hold for a Poisson–Lie group:

Here,  denotes left-multiplication and  denotes right-multiplication.

In particular, taking  one obtains , or equivalently . Applying Weinstein splitting theorem to  one sees that non-trivial Poisson-Lie structure is never symplectic, not even of constant rank.

Poisson-Lie groups - Lie bialgebra correspondence 
The Lie algebra  of a Poisson–Lie group has a natural structure of Lie coalgebra given by linearising the Poisson tensor  at the identity, i.e.  is a comultiplication. Moreover, the algebra and the coalgebra structure are compatible, i.e.  is a Lie bialgebra,

The classical Lie group–Lie algebra correspondence, which gives an equivalence of categories between simply connected Lie groups and finite-dimensional Lie algebras, was extended by Drinfeld to an equivalence of categories between simply connected Poisson–Lie groups and finite-dimensional Lie bialgebras.

Thanks to Drinfeld theorem, any Poisson–Lie group  has a dual Poisson–Lie group, defined as the Poisson–Lie group integrating the dual  of its bialgebra.

Homomorphisms 
A Poisson–Lie group homomorphism  is defined to be both a Lie group homomorphism and a Poisson map. Although this is the "obvious" definition, neither left translations nor right translations are Poisson maps. Also, the inversion map  taking  is not a Poisson map either, although it is an anti-Poisson map:

Examples

Trivial examples 

 Any trivial Poisson structure on a Lie group  defines a Poisson–Lie group structure, whose bialgebra is simply  with the trivial comultiplication.
 The dual  of a Lie algebra, together with its linear Poisson structure, is an additive Poisson–Lie group.

These two example are dual of each other via Drinfeld theorem, in the sense explained above.

Other examples 
Let  be any semisimple Lie group. Choose a maximal torus  and a choice of positive roots. 
Let  be the corresponding opposite Borel subgroups, so that  and there is a natural projection .
Then define a Lie group 

This defines a Poisson–Lie group structure on both  and on the dual Poisson Lie group  . 
This is the "standard" example: the Drinfeld-Jimbo quantum group  is a quantization of the Poisson algebra of functions on the group .
Note that is solvable, whereas  is semisimple.

See also 
 Lie bialgebra
 Quantum group
 Affine quantum group
 Quantum affine algebras

References

Lie groups
Symplectic geometry
Structures on manifolds